Charles Carey may refer to:

 Charles F. Carey, Jr. (1915–1945), United States Army soldier and Medal of Honor recipient
 Charles James Carey (1838–1891), Royal Navy officer
Charles Carey (producer), Oscar-nominated producer of the 1960 documentary George Grosz' Interregnum

See also 
Henry Charles Carey (1793–1879), economist